Sofia Sewing (born July 22, 1999) is an American professional tennis player. She has reached a career-high ITF junior ranking of world No. 9, as well as WTA rankings of 470 in singles and 248 in doubles.

In her career, Sewing has won four singles and seven doubles titles at tournaments of the ITF Circuit. Her most recent singles title came on January 19, 2020, in Cancún, Mexico, and Guayaquil, Ecuador, and Lima, Peru in 2022.

ITF Circuit finals

Singles: 8 (4 titles, 4 runner-ups)

Doubles: 15 (7 titles, 8 runner-ups)

Notes

References

External links
 
 
 University of Miami Profile

American female tennis players
1999 births
Living people
Miami Hurricanes women's tennis players
Tennis players from Miami